The Black Count is a 1920 German silent film directed by Otz Tollen and starring Olga Engl, Alfred Abel, and Rudolf Klein-Rogge.

The film's sets were designed by the art director Franz Schroedter.

Cast

References

Bibliography

External links

1920 films
Films of the Weimar Republic
German silent feature films
Films directed by Otz Tollen
German black-and-white films
1920s German films